The 2017–18 Northern Ireland Football League Cup (known as the BetMcLean League Cup for sponsorship purposes) was the 32nd edition of Northern Ireland's football knock-out cup competition for national league clubs, and the fourth edition of the competition as the Northern Ireland Football League Cup. This season's League Cup was contested by all 36 clubs of the three divisions of the Northern Ireland Football League. The competition began on 5 August 2017 with the first round, and concluded on 17 February 2018 with the final. The competition was sponsored for the first time by McLean Bookmakers.

Ballymena United were the defending champions, defeating Carrick Rangers 2–0 in the 2017 final to win the competition for the first time. This season they reached the final once again, but were defeated 3–1 by Dungannon Swifts, who won the competition to record the first ever senior trophy win in their 69-year history.

Format and schedule
The competition was played in a straight knock-out format and was open to the 36 members of the Northern Ireland Football League. Replays were not used in the competition, with all matches using extra time and penalties to determine the winner if necessary.

Results
The league tier of each club at the time of entering the competition is listed in parentheses.

First round
The matches took place on 5 August 2017.

|}

Second round
The matches took place on 29 August 2017. The top 16 league clubs from the previous season were seeded in this round in order to avoid drawing each other.

|}

Third round
The matches took place from 3–17 October 2017.

|colspan="3" style="background:#E8FFD8;"|3 October 2017

|-
|colspan="3" style="background:#E8FFD8;"|10 October 2017

|-
|colspan="3" style="background:#E8FFD8;"|17 October 2017

|}

Quarter-finals
The matches took place on 15 November 2017.

|}

Semi-finals
Both matches were scheduled to take place on 12 December 2017, however due to weather postponements they were played on 30 January 2018 and 10 February 2018.

|colspan="3" style="background:#E8FFD8;"|30 January 2018

|-
|colspan="3" style="background:#E8FFD8;"|10 February 2018

|}

Final
The final was played on 17 February 2018 at Windsor Park.

References

Lea
2017–18 European domestic association football cups
2017-18